Appleby is an Old English surname, and combines Apple or Appel, indicating an apple, and the Danish suffix by meaning 'settlement', indicating someone who lived near an apple orchard, or someone who farmed apples. Notable people with the surname include:

Anne Appleby (born 1954), American painter
Austin Appleby (born 1993), American football quarterback
Ben Appleby (1876–1961), English footballer
Charlie Appleby (born 1975), British racehorse trainer
Flynn Appleby (born 1999), Australian rules footballer
Fred Appleby (1879–1956), English long-distance runner
Jim Appleby (1934–2014), English footballer
John Appleby (1840–1917), American inventor
Kim Appleby (born 1961), British singer
Louis Appleby, British psychiatrist
Melanie Appleby (1966–1990), British singer; sister of Kim
Shiri Appleby (born 1978), American actress
Stephen Appleby (1912–1984), British pilot
Steven Appleby (born 1956), cartoonist, illustrator and artist living in Britain
Stuart Appleby (born 1971), Australian golfer
Susanna Appleby (1689–1769), English antiquarian
Ken Appleby (born 1995), Canadian ice hockey player

Fictional characters:
Appleby (Catch-22), a character in the novel Catch-22
Sir Humphrey Appleby, a fictional character in the television series Yes, Minister
Sir John Appleby, a fictional detective created by Michael Innes

English-language surnames
English toponymic surnames